Marco Cepeda (born 1 July 1974) is a Spanish middle-distance runner. He competed in the men's 3000 metres steeplechase at the 2000 Summer Olympics.

References

1974 births
Living people
Athletes (track and field) at the 2000 Summer Olympics
Spanish male middle-distance runners
Spanish male steeplechase runners
Olympic athletes of Spain
Place of birth missing (living people)